Linz is a city on the Danube in Upper Austria, Austria. 

Linz may also refer to:

Places

 Linz am Rhein, a small on the Rhine in Rhineland-Palatinate, Germany
 Linz, a subdivision of the town of Himmelberg in Carinthia, Austria

Other uses
 Land Information New Zealand, a New Zealand government agency
 , an Austro-Hungarian ocean liner that hit a mine and sank in the Adriatic Sea in 1918
 Symphony No. 36 (Mozart), a symphony by Mozart known as the "Linz Symphony"

People with the surname
Alex D. Linz (born 1989), American actor
Amélie Linz (1824–1904), German author
Cathie Linz (1954–2013), American librarian and writer
Juan José Linz (1926–2013), Spanish-German professor of sociology and political science
Paul Linz (born 1956), German football player and manager
Peter Linz (born 1967), American puppeteer
Phil Linz (1939–2020), American baseball player
Pia Linz (born 1964), German artist
Karel Linz (born 1986), Czech volleyball player
Mark Linz (1935–2013), German-American publisher
Roland Linz (born 1981), Austrian footballer

See also
Linz Program of 1882